The 2013 WGC-Bridgestone Invitational was a professional golf tournament played August 1–4 on the South Course of Firestone Country Club in Akron, Ohio. It was the 15th WGC-Bridgestone Invitational tournament, and the third of the World Golf Championships (WGC) events held in 2013.

Aided by a second round 61 (−9), Tiger Woods won the event for the eighth time, seven strokes ahead of runners-up Keegan Bradley and Henrik Stenson. It was Woods' 18th WGC victory. The win was also the 79th Tour title for Woods.

Venue

Course layout
The South Course, opened in 1929, was designed by Bert Way and redesigned by Robert Trent Jones in 1960.

Field
The field consisted of players drawn primarily from the Official World Golf Ranking and the winners of the world-wide tournaments with the strongest fields.

1. Playing members of the 2012 United States and European Ryder Cup teams.
Keegan Bradley (2,3,4), Nicolas Colsaerts (2,3), Luke Donald (2,3,4), Jason Dufner (2,3), Jim Furyk (2,3), Sergio García (2,3,4), Peter Hanson (2,3,4), Dustin Johnson (2,3,4), Zach Johnson (2,3), Martin Kaymer (2,3), Matt Kuchar (2,3,4), Paul Lawrie (2,4), Graeme McDowell (2,3,4), Rory McIlroy (2,3,4), Phil Mickelson (2,3,4), Francesco Molinari (2,3), Ian Poulter (2,3,4), Justin Rose (2,3,4), Webb Simpson (2,3), Brandt Snedeker (2,3,4), Steve Stricker (2,3), Bubba Watson (2,3), Lee Westwood (2,3), Tiger Woods (2,3,4)

2. The top 50 players from the Official World Golf Ranking as of July 22, 2013.
Jonas Blixt (3,4), Ángel Cabrera (3), Jason Day (3), Jamie Donaldson (3,4), Ernie Els (3,4), Gonzalo Fernández-Castaño (3,4), Rickie Fowler (3), Bill Haas (3,4), Branden Grace (3,4), Billy Horschel (3,4), Martin Laird (3,4), Matteo Manassero (3,4), Hideki Matsuyama (3), Ryan Moore (3,4), Thorbjørn Olesen (3), Scott Piercy (3), Carl Pettersson (3), Charl Schwartzel (3,4,5), Adam Scott (3,4), Henrik Stenson (3), Richard Sterne (3), Kevin Streelman (3,4), Bo Van Pelt (3), Nick Watney (3,4)

Louis Oosthuizen (3,4) withdrew with a neck injury.
Hunter Mahan (3) withdrew after the birth of his first child the prior week.

3. The top 50 players from the Official World Golf Ranking as of July 29, 2013.
David Lynn

4. Tournament winners, whose victories are considered official, of tournaments from the Federation Tours since the prior season's Bridgestone Invitational with an Official World Golf Ranking Strength of Field Rating of 115 points or more.
Kiradech Aphibarnrat, Bae Sang-moon, Paul Casey, Ken Duke, Harris English, Derek Ernst, Tommy Gainey, Stephen Gallacher, Brian Gay, Russell Henley, Mikko Ilonen, Miguel Ángel Jiménez, Shane Lowry, John Merrick, D. A. Points, Richie Ramsay, Brett Rumford, Michael Thompson, Boo Weekley, Chris Wood

Peter Senior and Jordan Spieth did not play.

5. The winner of selected tournaments from each of the following tours:
Asian Tour: Thailand Golf Championship (2012) – Charl Schwartzel, also qualified in categories 2, 3, and 4
PGA Tour of Australasia: Australian PGA Championship (2012) – Daniel Popovic
Japan Golf Tour: Bridgestone Open (2012) – Toru Taniguchi
Japan Golf Tour: Japan Golf Tour Championship (2013) – Satoshi Kodaira
Sunshine Tour: Dimension Data Pro-Am (2013) – Jaco van Zyl

Past champions in the field 

Source:

Round summaries

First round
Thursday, August 1, 2013
 
Source:

Second round
Friday, August 2, 2013
  
Source:

Third round
Saturday, August 3, 2013
 
Source:

Final round
Sunday, August 4, 2013

Source:

Scorecard
Final round

Cumulative tournament scores, relative to par

Source:

References

External links

Coverage on European Tour's official site
Firestone Country Club site

WGC Invitational
WGC-Bridgestone Invitational
WGC-Bridgestone Invitational
WGC-Bridgestone Invitational